10 Rules for Falling in Love is a 2012 romantic comedy film written and directed by Cristiano Bortone and starring Guglielmo Scilla, Vincenzo Salemme and Enrica Pintore.

Plot 
In the 2012 Italian film, 10 Regole Per Fare Innamorare, or in english, 10 Rules for Falling in Love, Renato (Vincenzo Salemme), guides his young son, Marco (Giuglielmo Scilla) on the rules of love. Renato is a womanizing father trying to reconnect with his clumsy son over a woman he has fallen for. Throughout the movie, Renato teaches Marco the Decalogue of Seduction: Ten foolproof rules to make any woman fall in love. On this journey of discovering love, Renato and Marco try to reconnect while setting up the latter with someone they are in love with.

Cast 

 Guglielmo Scilla as Marco
 Vincenzo Salemme as  Renato 
  as  Stefania
 Giulio Berruti as  Ettore
 Pietro Masotti as  Paolo
  as Ivan
 Fatima Trotta as  Mary
 Giorgio Verducci as  Sandrone 
  as Laura

See also 
 List of Italian films of 2012

References

External links 

2012 romantic comedy films
2012 films
Italian romantic comedy films
Films directed by Cristiano Bortone
2010s Italian films